Digital soil mapping (DSM) in soil science, also referred to as predictive soil mapping or pedometric mapping, is the computer-assisted production of digital maps of soil types and soil properties. Soil mapping, in general, involves the creation and population of spatial soil information by the use of field and laboratory observational methods coupled with spatial and non-spatial soil inference systems.

The international Working Group on Digital Soil Mapping (WG-DSM) defines digital soil mapping as "the creation and the population of a geographically referenced soil databases generated at a given resolution by using field and laboratory observation methods coupled with environmental data through quantitative relationships."

Ambiguities 

DSM can rely upon, but is considered to be distinct from traditional soil mapping, which involves manual delineation of soil boundaries by field soil scientists. Non-digital soil maps produced as result of manual delineation of soil mapping units may also be digitized or surveyors may draw boundaries using field computers, hence both traditional, knowledge-based and technology and data-driven soil mapping frameworks are in essence digital. Unlike traditional soil mapping, digital soil mapping is, however, considered to make an extensive use of:
 technological advances, including GPS receivers, field scanners, and remote sensing, and
 computational advances, including geostatistical interpolation and inference algorithms, GIS, digital elevation model, and data mining

In digital soil mapping, semi-automated techniques and technologies are used to acquire, process and visualize information on soils and auxiliary information, so that the end result can be obtained at cheaper costs. Products of the data-driven or statistical soil mapping are commonly assessed for the accuracy and uncertainty and can be more easily updated when new information comes available.

Digital soil mapping tries to overcome some of the drawbacks of the traditional soil maps that are often only focused on delineating soil-classes i.e. soil types. Such traditional soil maps:
 do not provide information for modeling the dynamics of soil conditions and
 are inflexible to quantitative studies on the functionality of soils.
An example of successful digital soil mapping application is the physical properties (soil texture, bulk density) developed in the European Union with around 20,000 topsoil samples of LUCAS database.

Scorpan

Scorpan is a mnemonic for an empirical quantitative descriptions of relationships between soil and environmental factors with a view to using these as soil spatial prediction functions for the purpose of Digital soil mapping. It is an adaptation of Hans Jenny's five factors not for explanation of soil formation, but for empirical descriptions of relationships between soil and other spatially referenced factors.

S = f(s,c,o,r,p,a,n), where
 S = soil classes or attributes (to be modeled)
 f = function
 s = soil, other or previously measured properties of the soil at a point
 c = climate, climatic properties of the environment at a point
 o = organisms, including land cover and natural vegetation or fauna or human activity
 r = relief, topography, landscape attributes
 p = parent material, lithology
 a = age, the time factor
 n = spatial or geographic position

See also
Pedometric mapping
SSURGO

References

External links
Working group on Digital Soil Mapping
Pedometrics Commission of the International Union of Soil Sciences
NRCS Web Soil Survey Inventory of the soil resource across the U.S.
GlobalSoilMap.net Project 

Pedology